Alice Lilan Bowden (born September 1, 1985) is an American actress, filmmaker, and comedian. She is best known for her roles as Rebecca "Bex" Mack in Andi Mack and Amber Kang in the Netflix series Murderville.

Life and career
Lilan Bowden was born to a Taiwanese mother and white father. She attended Castro Valley High School where she had joined an improv club and graduated in 2002. Bowden attended University of California, Irvine where she continued to perform in comedy. After graduating, she moved to Los Angeles and joined the Upright Citizens Brigade. She also began writing videos with her writing partner Wilder Smith, featured on Funny or Die during this time.

Bowden began auditioning for roles which was made difficult due to her mixed race heritage. "The roles you get as a minority usually cluster in certain category...I felt like every year I was going out and testing for at least one pilot where I was the sassy, ethnic best friend...I still think that we have a lot of work to do as far as entertaining someone who’s not white for the lead role of TV shows." She suddenly auditioned for the show Andi Mack and got the role of Bex, the single young mother of the title character. "I feel like I hit the jackpot!...It’s so exciting to be a part of a female dominant cast that is an Asian American family and doesn’t fit the model minority." She added that she finds the positive message of the show enticing and feels that she earned the role through perseverance.

Bowden is set to direct upcoming film Becoming Eddie.

In 2022, Bowden joined current and past Disney employees who criticized Bob Chapek for refusing to criticize anti-LGBT legislation that was passed in Florida.
Bowden came out bisexual on Twitter in March 2022.

She endorsed Eunisses Hernandez, Hugo Soto-Martinez, and Kenneth Mejia during the 2022 Los Angeles elections.

Filmography

Filmmaking credits
Becoming Eddie (2020)

Film

Television

Web

References

External links

Lilan and Wilder website 

Living people
1985 births
21st-century American comedians
American actresses of Taiwanese descent
American comedy writers
American film actresses
American sketch comedians
American television actresses
American women comedians
American women film directors
Comedians from California
Members of the Democratic Socialists of America
University of California, Irvine alumni
21st-century American actresses
bisexual actresses